Introducing Paul Bley is the debut album by Canadian jazz pianist Paul Bley recorded in 1953 and released on Charles Mingus'  Debut label.

Reception
The AllMusic review by Scott Yanow awarded the album 3 stars stating "Paul Bley may not have been distinctive this early on but he clearly had a potentially strong future". The Penguin Guide to Jazz called it "that astonishing debut with Mingus and Blakey on which he sounds edgy and a little cautious on the standards but absolutely secure in his technique".

Track listing
 "Opus 1" (Paul Bley)- 4:08	
 "Opus 1 (Alternate Take) (Paul Bley) - 3:21 Bonus track on CD reissue	
 "(Teapot) Walkin'" (Richard Carpenter) - 4:28	
 "Like Someone in Love" (Johnny Burke, Jimmy van Heusen) - 4:03	
 "Spontaneous Combustion" (Paul Bley) – 4:15	
 "Split Kick" (Horace Silver) - 3:05	
 "I Can't Get Started" (Ira Gershwin, Vernon Duke) - 3:37	
 "Santa Claus Is Coming to Town" (Haven Gillespie, J. Fred Coots) - 3:22 Bonus track on CD reissue	
 "The Theme" (Paul Bley) - 3:40 Bonus track on CD reissue	
 "This Time the Dream's on Me" (Harold Arlen, Johnny Mercer) - 3:07 Bonus track on CD reissue	
 "Zootcase" (Zoot Sims) - 2:33 Bonus track on CD reissue
Recorded in New York City on November 30, 1953.

Personnel 
 Paul Bley — piano 
 Charles Mingus — bass 
 Art Blakey — drums

References 

Debut Records albums
Paul Bley albums
1954 debut albums